The Third Ottoman Venetian War (1537–1540) was one of the Ottoman–Venetian wars which took place during the 16th century. The war arose out of the Franco-Ottoman alliance between Francis I of France and Süleyman I of the Ottoman Empire against the Holy Roman Emperor Charles V.  The initial plan between the two had been to jointly invade Italy,  Francis through Lombardy in the North and Süleyman through Apulia to the South.  However, the proposed invasion failed to take place.

In what became known as the Italian War of 1536–1538, Francis's invasion of Piedmont, having made modest territorial gains, was halted by Genoa, an ally of Charles V.  Furthermore, he was not able to put all his resources against the city as he also had to fend off Charles V's invasion of Provence.  At the same time, Süleyman was not yet ready to engage in a large-scale invasion of the Kingdom of Naples thus not giving Francis any relief.  Ottoman troops were landed in Otranto from their encampment in Valona on July 23, 1537 but these were pulled out within a month when it became clear that Francis was not going to invade Lombardy.  However, the landing and raiding of Ottoman soldiers in Apulia and the presence of the large Ottoman fleet in the Strait of Otranto did generate considerable fear in Rome that a large-scale invasion would follow.

At the same time, crisis in Venetian-Ottoman relations was developing during the siege of Klis - last Habsburg stronghold in Dalmatia, that fell in March 1537. Venetian government feared that Turkish forces would attack Dalmatian cities and resorted to diplomatic efforts in order to avoid the war.

This fears were further strengthened when following a skirmish with Andrea Doria, the Ottomans suddenly laid siege to the Venetian Island of Corfu in the Adriatic (Siege of Corfu 1537), thus breaking the peace treaty signed with Venice in 1502. On Corfu, the Ottomans faced formidable resistance and defenses specifically designed to counter Ottoman artillery.  The siege lasted less than two weeks, and afterward Süleyman withdrew his forces and returned east to spend the winter in Adrianople.

These events resolved Pope Paul III of the need to form a Holy League (1538) to combat and to deter the Ottoman assaults that were expected in the next year.  Through intense diplomacy the Pope stopped the war between Charles V and Francis I with the Truce of Nice and secured Charles's support. Venice also joined the league but only reluctantly and after much debate in the senate.

The Ottoman fleet had grown greatly in size as well as in competence over the course of the 16th century and was now headed by the former corsair turned admiral Hayreddin Barbarossa Pasha. In the summer of 1538 the Ottomans turned their attention to the remaining Venetian possessions in the Aegean capturing the islands of Andros, Naxos, Paros, and Santorini, as well as taking the last two Venetian settlements on the Peloponnese Monemvasia and Navplion.  The Ottomans next turned their focus to the Adriatic.  Here, in what the Venetians considered their home waters, the Ottomans, through the combined use of their navy and their army in Albania, captured a string of forts in Dalmatia and formally secured their hold there.  The most important battle of the war was the Battle of Préveza, which the Ottomans won thanks to the strategy of Barbarossa, Seydi Ali Reis, and Turgut Reis, as well as bad management of the Holy League. After taking Kotor, the supreme commander of the League's navy the Genoese Andrea Doria managed to trap Barbarossa's navy in the Ambracian Gulf.  This was to Barbarossa's advantage however as he was supported by the Ottoman army in Préveza while Doria, unable to lead a general assault for fear of Ottoman artillery, had to wait in the open sea.  Eventually Doria signaled a retreat at which time Barbarossa attacked leading to a major Ottoman victory.  The events of this battle, as well as the events of the Siege of Castelnuovo (1539) put a stop to any Holy League plans to bring the fight to the Ottomans in their own territory and coerced the League to begin talks to end the war.  The war was particularly painful to the Venetians as they lost most of the rest of their foreign holdings as well as showing them that they could no longer take on even the Ottoman navy alone.

A peace treaty or "capitulation" was signed between Venice and the Ottoman Empire to end the war on 2 October 1540. The Venetian negotiator and signatory was Alvise Badoer. Venice ratified the treaty on 20 November.

In the period between the start of the Second Ottoman–Venetian War in 1499 and the end of this war in 1540, the Ottoman Empire made significant advances in the Dalmatian hinterland – it didn't occupy the Venetian cities, but it took the Kingdom of Hungary's Croatian possessions between Skradin and Karin, eliminating them as a buffer zone between the Ottoman and Venetian territory. The economy of the Venetian cities in Dalmatia, severely impacted by the Turkish occupation of the hinterland in the previous war, recovered and held steady even throughout this war.

The Battle of Preveza was the Ottomans' greatest victory against Westerners.

See also
 Ottoman–Venetian Wars

Notes

References
 
 Garnier, Edith L'Alliance Impie Editions du Felin, 2008, Paris  Interview
 Goffman, Daniel. The Ottoman Empire and Early Modern Europe. N.p.: Cambridge University, 		2002. Print. New Approaches to European History.
 
 Labib, Subhi. “The Era of Suleyman the Magnificent: Crisis of Orientation”. International 		Journal of Middle East Studies 10.4 (1979): 435–451. Web...
 
 
Soucek, Svatopluk. “Navals Aspects of the Ottoman Conquests of Rhodes, Cyprus and Crete”. 		Studia Islamica 98/99 (2004): 219–261. Web...

1537-1540
1530s conflicts
Conflicts in 1540
Military history of the Mediterranean
1537 in Italy
1537 in the Ottoman Empire
1540 in Italy
1540 in the Ottoman Empire
1539 in Italy
1539 in the Ottoman Empire
1538 in Italy
1538 in the Ottoman Empire
Ottoman–Spanish conflicts